Inside Out was a hardcore punk band from Orange County, California. It was fronted by Zack de la Rocha, later of Rage Against the Machine.

Biography
Inside Out existed from August 1988 to roughly fall of 1991, releasing a single 7-inch EP, No Spiritual Surrender, in 1990, on Revelation Records (later converted to six song CD). They played up and down the West Coast and even toured the East Coast once before their breakup in 1991. Many of their songs' themes are spiritual, but not necessarily religious. They had written material for a second record, to be titled Rage Against the Machine (hence the name for de la Rocha's next band), but the band broke up shortly after their guitarist, Vic DiCara, left the band to become a Hare Krishna monk.  Vic later started 108, a Krishna-themed hardcore band, and briefly joined Burn, playing guitar in both. 

Inside Out performed on California radio station KXLU, showcasing a number of new songs. The quality of the recording on the show, while adequate for a radio broadcast, is not on par with that of the band's EP recording. Copies of their on-air radio broadcast and various live sets have circulated the tape trading underground and file sharing world for years as popular items. In early 2013, a high quality version of one of their final shows from May 1991 surfaced and was remastered and made publicly available. Lyrics to the previously unreleased songs "Rage Against the Machine" and "Darkness of Greed" were deciphered, and together they give new context to the early beginnings of Rage Against the Machine. Some of their songs focus on issues in society and in the USA (Redemption, Burning Fight) and some are personal to members of the band (Sacrifice, By a Thread). In October 2016, a VHS video of a 1990 Inside Out show in Reading, PA surfaced and was made available online. According to hate5six.com founder Sunny Singh, the Reading, PA video "includes a number of [Inside Out]'s unreleased material. Burning Fight, Deathbed (which Vic later transformed into 108's famous anthem), Undertone (Zack screaming "WAKE UP!" over and over again at the beginning foreshadows the chorus of a slightly more famous song he would write a year later), Empty Days, Redemption, Blind Oppressor, Turn and Face."

Remixes
In 2006, the track "No Spiritual Surrender" was contributed to the mashup album Threat: Music That Inspired the Movie, where it was remixed by Oktopus from Dälek and dubbed "Ghost in the Machine".

Musical style and legacy
Inside Out were a hardcore punk band, in particular, they were a part of its youth crew subculture. They cited influences including Minor Threat, Bad Brains and Led Zeppelin. Just prior to the band's breakup, the music being written was significantly more influenced by hip hop, particularly Run-DMC.

Songs were composed by DiCara and Rocha evenly, with some songs having instrumentals and lyrics written by DiCara and some by Rocha while others were collaborations between the two.

They have been cited as an influence by Have Heart, Stick to Your Guns, Linkin Park, Refused, Incendiary, Coalesce and Mouthpiece.

Members

EP lineup 
 Zack de la Rocha – vocals (Rage Against the Machine, Hardstance, One Day as a Lion, Farside)
 Vic DiCara – guitar (Shelter, Beyond, Burn, 108)
 Mark Hayworth – bass (Hardstance, Gorilla Biscuits)
 Chris Bratton – drums (Drive Like Jehu, Justice League, No For An Answer, Chain of Strength, Statue, Wool)

Previous 
Rob Haworth – guitar (Hardstance, Farside)
Alex Barreto – drums (Against the Wall, Chain of Strength, Hardstance, Statue, World's Fastest Car, Ignite, Alien Ant Farm)
Sterling Wilson – bass (Reason to Believe, No For An Answer)
Mike Down – guitar (Amenity, Forced Down)
Joey Piro – drums (Pitchfork, Forced Down)
Michael Rosas – guitar (Headfirst, Smile)

Discography
 No Spiritual Surrender – EP, (1990)

References

External links 

 Inside Out biography
 Myspace page
 Revelation Records
 Inside Out lyrics
 zdlr.net, the Zack de la Rocha community.
 Static Void

Hardcore punk groups from California
Musical groups from Orange County, California
Revelation Records artists
Musical groups established in 1988
Musical groups disestablished in 1991